Aberdeen F.C. competed in Scottish Football League Division One and the Scottish Cup in season 1909–10.

Overview

The 1909–10 season was Aberdeen's seventh overall and fifth in the top flight. This season saw Aberdeen finish fourth out of 18 clubs in the league, their highest league position since joining División One in 1905. In the Scottish Cup, they were knocked out in the third round by Celtic. New signings included forward Jimmy Soye from Newcastle United, who scored on his debut for the Wasps.

Results

Scottish División One

Final standings

Scottish Cup

Squad

Appearances & Goals

|}

References

Aberdeen F.C. seasons
Aberdeen